Alberto Belgeri is an Italian rower. He won a gold medal at the 1986 World Rowing Championships in Nottingham with the men's double sculls.

References

Year of birth missing (living people)
Italian male rowers
World Rowing Championships medalists for Italy
Living people